Kennington is a surname. Notable people with the surname include:

 Alan Kennington  (1906–1986), British novelist
 D. J. Kennington (born 1977), Canadian professional stock car racing drive
 Dale Kennington (1935–2017), American artist
 Eric Kennington (1888–1960), English sculptor
 Jill Kennington (born 1943), British fashion model and photographer
 Richard Kennington (1921–1999), American philosopher
 Thomas Benjamin Kennington (1856–1916), British painter